Ingrid Bisa (born 1978) is an Italian politician. She was elected to be a deputy to the Parliament of Italy in the 2018 Italian general election for the Legislature XVIII of Italy.

Career
Bisa was born on January 10, 1978, in Asolo, Province of Treviso.

She was elected to the Italian Parliament in the 2018 Italian general election, to represent the district of Veneto 1 from Montebelluna, for the Lega Nord party.

References

Living people
Lega Nord politicians
1978 births
Deputies of Legislature XVIII of Italy
People from Asolo
21st-century Italian women politicians
Women members of the Chamber of Deputies (Italy)